Thomas Sewell Jr (15 March 1830 – 13 June 1871) was an English professional cricketer whose known top-class career spanned the years 1851 to 1868. His father was Tom Sewell Sr.

A right-handed batsman and right arm fast roundarm bowler, he made over 150 known top-class appearances, of which 20 were for Kent between 1856 and 1866 and over 100 were for Surrey between 1859 and 1868.  He represented the Players in the Gentlemen v Players series on one occasion and, from 1860 to 1864, was a member of the United All-England Eleven (UEE). He was also a member of the team led by H. H. Stephenson on the inaugural tour of Australia in 1861–62; the team travelled on the SS Great Britain.

References

External links
 

1830 births
1871 deaths
English cricketers of 1826 to 1863
English cricketers of 1864 to 1889
English cricketers
Kent cricketers
North v South cricketers
Players cricketers
Players of Surrey cricketers
Players of the South cricketers
Southgate cricketers
Surrey Club cricketers
Surrey cricketers
United All-England Eleven cricketers